Blackadder's Christmas Carol, a one-off episode of Blackadder, is a parody of Charles Dickens' 1843 novella A Christmas Carol. It is set between Blackadder the Third (1987) and Blackadder Goes Forth (1989), and is narrated by Hugh Laurie. Produced by the BBC, it was first broadcast on BBC1 on 23 December 1988.

Plot
Ebenezer Blackadder (Rowan Atkinson), the Victorian proprietor of a "moustache shop", is the nicest man in England. He is everything that Ebenezer Scrooge was by the end of the original story: generous and kind to everybody, and sensitive to the misery of others. As a result, people take advantage of his kindness – Mrs. Scratchit and an orphan take all his money, his god-daughter Millicent takes his presents and Christmas tree, and a beadle takes his food. All but Mr. Baldrick (Tony Robinson) view him as a victim. His business turns no profit, all his earnings go to charity and con artists, and despite his positive attitude, he lives a lonely, miserable life.

One Christmas Eve, Blackadder's destiny changes when the Spirit of Christmas (Robbie Coltrane) visits him to congratulate him for his ways. The Spirit lets him see two shades of the past: his Blackadder ancestors (the protagonists of Blackadder II and Blackadder the Third). Instead of providing positive reinforcement that Ebenezer is better than his forefathers, these visions lead him to admire them and their wit. He asks the Spirit to show him what could happen if he became like them. He sees a vision of a distant future where his descendant, Grand Admiral Blackadder, is a successful and ruthless official of a galactic empire, about to marry the similarly ruthless and insanely ambitious Queen Asphyxia XIX (Miranda Richardson) after murdering her "triple husbandoid". The future Baldrick, wearing a loincloth, is Blackadder's slave. Blackadder asks the Spirit what will happen if he stays as he is. He is shown an alternative future in which his descendant is the loincloth-clad slave of the incompetent Admiral Baldrick.

Contrary to the Spirit's intended point, Blackadder takes "the very clear lesson that bad guys have all the fun". On Christmas morning, he wakes up a different man: bitter, vengeful, greedy, and insulting to everyone he meets. Now feeling in control of his life, he misses an opportunity when he insults two strangers who claim to be Queen Victoria (Miriam Margolyes) and Prince Albert (Jim Broadbent) and throws them out of his home. The episode ends on Blackadder's extravagant Christmas dinner, which is ruined when Baldrick shows him the royal seal left behind by the strangers, proving Baldrick's story that the Queen and Prince Albert had planned to award Blackadder a gift of £50,000 and the title of Baron Blackadder for being the "nicest man in England".

Edited version 

Most versions of this special edit Baldrick's speech about a dog being used as Jesus for the Nativity play to remove a line in which Baldrick says the dog will be nailed to a cross for Easter. The earliest known case of this edit was on its first rerun in December 1989. The same version was used for later terrestrial broadcasts when the special aired on Christmas in the years 1998, 2007, 2008, 2010, and 2012. The edited version is also seen in the Blackadder Ultimate Edition DVD set, on the UK channel Gold since 2018 (the uncut version was screened until 2017) and, as of 2016, is on Hulu Plus. The original uncut version can be seen on the Region 1 U.S. DVD set, and on the U.S. and UK versions of Netflix.

Cast
 Rowan Atkinson as Ebenezer Blackadder/Lord Edmund Blackadder/Mr. E. Blackadder Esq./Grand Admiral Blackadder
 Tony Robinson as Mr. Baldrick and his ancestors and descendants
 Stephen Fry as Lord Melchett/Lord Frondo
 Hugh Laurie as Prince George/Prince Pigmot
 Miranda Richardson as Queen Elizabeth/Queen Asphyxia XIX
 Robbie Coltrane as the Spirit of Christmas
 Miriam Margolyes as Queen Victoria
 Jim Broadbent as Prince Albert
 Patsy Byrne as Nursie/Bernard
 Denis Lill as Beadle
 Pauline Melville as Mrs. Scratchit
 Philip Pope as Lord Nelson
 Nicola Bryant as Millicent, Blackadder's goddaughter ("Awful Screeching Woman" on BBC DVD cover)
 Ramsay Gilderdale as Ralph, Millicent's fiancé ("Giggling Ninny" on BBC DVD cover)
 David Barber, Erkan Mustafa and David Nunn as the Enormous Orphans

See also
 List of A Christmas Carol adaptations
 "Merry Christmas, Mr. Bean" – another Christmas show starring Rowan Atkinson
 List of Christmas films

References

External links
 
 
 Transcript at Blackadder Hall website

Blackadder
Television shows based on A Christmas Carol
British Christmas television episodes
British supernatural television shows
Television shows set in London
British television specials
Television shows written by Ben Elton
1988 television specials
Television shows written by Richard Curtis
1988 British television episodes
Cultural depictions of Albert, Prince Consort
Cultural depictions of Queen Victoria on television